The Will of the People World Tour is an ongoing world concert tour by English rock band Muse, in support of their ninth studio album, Will of the People (2022). The tour began in April 2022, and is set to conclude in July 2023. The tour is Muse's first since the start of the COVID-19 pandemic, and is also the first to feature new touring member Dan Lancaster, who replaced long-time touring member Morgan Nicholls.

Set list

The following set list was obtained from the concert held on 26 February 2023 at Target Center in Minneapolis, Minnesota. It does not represent all concerts for the duration of the tour.

 "Will of the People" (with chant intro)
 "Hysteria" (with "Interlude" intro)
 "Psycho" (with "Drill Sergeant" intro)
 "Map of the Problematique
 "Won't Stand Down"
 "Compliance" (with "Kill or Be Killed" [Felsmann + Tiley Reinterpretation]) intro)
 "Thought Contagion"
 "Verona"
 "Time Is Running Out" (with "Interstitial 'Parkour" intro)
 "The 2nd Law: Isolated System"
 "Resistance"
 "You Make Me Feel Like It's Halloween"
 "Madness
 "We Are Fucking Fucked"
 "The Dark Side" (Alternate Reality version)
 "Supermassive Black Hole"
 "Plug In Baby" (with "Interstitial 'Driving" intro)
 "Behold, the Glove"
 "Uprising"
 "Starlight" (with "Prelude" intro)
Encore
  "Kill or Be Killed" (with "Simulation Theory Theme / [JFK]" intro)
 "Knights of Cydonia" (with "Man With A Harmonica" intro)

Shows

Notes

Personnel

Muse
 Matt Bellamy – lead vocals, guitars, piano, synthesizers
 Chris Wolstenholme – bass, backing vocals, harmonica
 Dominic Howard – drums, percussion, backing vocals
Additional musicians
 Dan Lancaster – keyboards, synthesizers, guitar, percussion, backing vocals
Crew
Metaform Studio – Creative direction
Sooner Routhier – Lighting design, lighting programming
Aaron D. Luke – Designer

References

Muse (band) concert tours
2022 concert tours
2023 concert tours